Lidia Barcella (born 21 April 1997) is an Italian racewalker who won an individual bronze medal at senior level at the 2021 European Race Walking Team Championships.

See also
 Italy at the European Race Walking Cup

References

External links
 

1997 births
Living people
Italian female racewalkers
Sportspeople from the Province of Bergamo
People from Alzano Lombardo